Joseph Whelan was an Irish footballer who played for Bohemian during the 1890s and early 20th century.

Whelan was one of the most important figures in the early day of football in Dublin. He was a founding member of Bohemian in 1890 and was the club's first captain. Whelan also has the honour of scoring Bohemians' first ever goal when he netted against Britannia on 1 November 1890. A respected full back, he played in the first team for over a decade and appeared in the Irish Cup Final in 1900 when Bohemians lost 2-1 to Cliftonville.

Off the field, he was Club President of Bohemian from 1900–1905 and Vice-President from 1905-1916.

Honours
Leinster Senior Cup: 6
 1893, 1894, 1895, 1896, 1897, 1898
Leinster League
 1899/1900, 1900/01

References

Year of birth missing
Year of death missing
Republic of Ireland association footballers
Bohemian F.C. players
Association footballers not categorized by position